The 2017 season is Strømsgodset's eleventh season back in Eliteserien since their promotion in the 2006 season.

Squad

Out on loan

Transfers

Winter

In:

Out:

Summer

In:

Out:

Competitions

Eliteserien

Results summary

Results by round

Results

Table

Norwegian Cup

Squad statistics

Appearances and goals

|-
|colspan="14"|Players away from Strømsgodset on loan:
|-
|colspan="14"|Players who left Strømsgodset during the season:

|}

Goal scorers

Disciplinary record

References

Strømsgodset Toppfotball seasons
Stromsgodset